Hagbarth Schjøtt Sr. (9 May 1894 – 9 September 1994) was a Norwegian businessperson.

He was born in Bergen, and took his education in England and the United States. His family ran a company named H. E. Schjøtt & Co, and Schjøtt started his own company named Hagbarth Schjøtt in 1926. His younger brother Olvar Schjøtt was employed as a manager. The company gradually expanded, and at its peak it had 600 employees. The company went bankrupt in 1993.

Schjøtt was also a board member of the Federation of Norwegian Industries. He had five children, among them the resistance member and businessperson Hagbarth Schjøtt Jr. In 1994 he celebrated his hundredth birthday.

References

1894 births
1994 deaths
Businesspeople from Bergen
Norwegian centenarians
Men centenarians
Norwegian company founders